Alfred Donnell Jenkins (born January 25, 1952) is an American former professional football player who was a wide receiver for the Birmingham Americans in 1974 and nine seasons for the Atlanta Falcons from 1975 through 1983. Jenkins was selected to the Pro Bowl during the 1980 and 1981 seasons and is considered the most successful National Football League (NFL) player from the short-lived  World Football League.

Jenkins played college football at Atlanta's Morris Brown College and was not selected in the 1974 NFL Draft. He received a tryout and signed with the WFL's Birmingham Americans. He scored 14 touchdowns and caught 62 passes for 1,471 yards while helping the Americans win the WFL's only championship that season. After the Americans folded, Jenkins signed with the Falcons on April 9, 1975. He became a mainstay at wide receiver, starting every game in each of his NFL seasons (with the exception of 1978, in which he played only one game before suffering a broken collarbone).  Jenkins led the NFL in receiving yards (1,358) and receiving touchdowns (13) in the 1981 season.

References

1952 births
Living people
St. Augustine High School (New Orleans) alumni
American football wide receivers
Morris Brown Wolverines football players
Atlanta Falcons players
Birmingham Americans players
National Conference Pro Bowl players
Players of American football from Georgia (U.S. state)
People from Hogansville, Georgia